Aleyrodidae is a large hemipteran family comprising the whiteflies. It contains the following species:

Aleyrodinae Westwood, 1840

Acanthaleyrodes Takahashi, 1931
Acanthaleyrodes callicarpae Takahashi, 1931
Acanthaleyrodes styraci Takahashi, 1942
Acanthobemisia Takahashi, 1935
Acanthobemisia distylii Takahashi, 1935
Acanthobemisia indicus Meganathan & David, 1994
Acaudaleyrodes Takahashi, 1951
Acaudaleyrodes africanus Dozier, 1934
Acaudaleyrodes ebeni Manzari & Alemansoor, 2005
Acaudaleyrodes pauliani Takahashi, 1951
Acaudaleyrodes rachipora Singh, 1931
Acaudaleyrodes tuberculata Bink-Moenen, 1983
Acutaleyrodes Takahashi, 1960
Acutaleyrodes palmae Takahashi, 1960
Africaleurodes Dozier, 1934
Africaleurodes adami Cohic, 1968
Africaleurodes ananthakrishnani Dubey & Sundararaj, 2006
Africaleurodes balachowskyi Cohic, 1968
Africaleurodes capgrasi Cohic, 1968
Africaleurodes citri Takahashi, 1932
Africaleurodes coffeacola Dozier, 1934
Africaleurodes fulakariensis Cohic, 1966
Africaleurodes hexalobi Bink-Moenen, 1983
Africaleurodes indicus Regu & David, 1993
Africaleurodes karwarensis Dubey & Sundararaj, 2006
Africaleurodes loganiaceae Dozier, 1934
Africaleurodes martini Cohic, 1968
Africaleurodes ochnaceae Dozier, 1934
Africaleurodes pauliani Cohic, 1968
Africaleurodes simula Peal, 1903
Africaleurodes souliei Ardaillon & Cohic, 1970
Africaleurodes tetracerae Cohic, 1966
Africaleurodes uvariae Cohic, 1968
Africaleurodes vrijdaghii Ghesquière in Mayné & Ghesquière, 1934
Agrostaleyrodes Ko, 2001
Agrostaleyrodes arcanus Ko in Ko, Chou & Wu, 2001
Aleurocanthus Quaintance & Baker, 1914
Aleurocanthus arecae David & Manjunatha, 2003
Aleurocanthus ayyari Regu & David, 1993
Aleurocanthus bambusae Peal, 1903
Aleurocanthus bangalorensis Dubey & Sundararaj, 2004
Aleurocanthus banksiae Maskell, 1896
Aleurocanthus brevispinosus Dumbleton, 1961
Aleurocanthus calophylli Kotinsky, 1907
Aleurocanthus ceracroceus Martin, 1999
Aleurocanthus cheni Young, 1942
Aleurocanthus chiengmaiensis Takahashi, 1942
Aleurocanthus cinnamomi Takahashi, 1931
Aleurocanthus citriperdus Quaintance & Baker, 1916
Aleurocanthus clitoriae Jesudasan & David, 1991
Aleurocanthus cocois Corbett, 1927
Aleurocanthus corbetti Takahashi, 1951
Aleurocanthus davidi David & Subramaniam, 1976
Aleurocanthus delottoi Cohic, 1969
Aleurocanthus dissimilis Quaintance & Baker, 1917
Aleurocanthus esakii Takahashi, 1936
Aleurocanthus eugeniae Takahashi, 1933
Aleurocanthus euphorbiae Jesudasan & David, 1991
Aleurocanthus ficicola David, 1993
Aleurocanthus firmianae Dubey & Sundararaj, 2004
Aleurocanthus froggatti Martin, 1999
Aleurocanthus gateri Corbett, 1927
Aleurocanthus goaensis Dubey & Sundararaj, 2004
Aleurocanthus gordoniae Takahashi, 1941
Aleurocanthus gymnosporiae Jesudasan & David, 1991
Aleurocanthus hibisci Corbett, 1935
Aleurocanthus hirsutus Maskell, 1896
Aleurocanthus husaini Corbett, 1939
Aleurocanthus imperialis Cohic, 1968
Aleurocanthus inceratus Silvestri, 1927
Aleurocanthus indicus David & Regu, 1989
Aleurocanthus ixorae Jesudasan & David, 1991
Aleurocanthus leptadeniae Cohic, 1968
Aleurocanthus lobulatus Jesudasan & David, 1991
Aleurocanthus longispinus Quaintance & Baker, 1917
Aleurocanthus loyolae David & Subramaniam, 1976
Aleurocanthus luteus Martin, 1985
Aleurocanthus mackenziei Cohic, 1969
Aleurocanthus mangiferae Quaintance & Baker, 1917
Aleurocanthus martini David, 1993
Aleurocanthus marudamalaiensis David & Subramanium, 1976
Aleurocanthus mayumbensis Cohic, 1966
Aleurocanthus multispinosus Dumbleton, 1961
Aleurocanthus musae David & Jesudasan, 2002
Aleurocanthus mvoutiensis Cohic, 1966
Aleurocanthus niger Corbett, 1926
Aleurocanthus nigricans Corbett, 1926
Aleurocanthus nudus Dumbleton, 1961
Aleurocanthus palauensis Kuwana in Kuwana & Muramatsu, 1931
Aleurocanthus papuanus Martin, 1985
Aleurocanthus pendleburyi Corbett, 1935
Aleurocanthus piperis Maskell, 1896
Aleurocanthus regis Mound, 1965
Aleurocanthus rugosa Singh, 1931
Aleurocanthus russellae Jesudasan & David, 1991
Aleurocanthus satyanarayani Dubey & Sundararaj, 2004
Aleurocanthus serratus Quaintance & Baker, 1917
Aleurocanthus seshadrii David & Subramaniam, 1976
Aleurocanthus shillongensis Jesudasan & David, 1991
Aleurocanthus siamensis Takahashi, 1942
Aleurocanthus singhi Jesudasan & David, 1991
Aleurocanthus spiniferus Quaintance, 1903
Aleurocanthus spinithorax Dumbleton, 1961
Aleurocanthus spinosus Kuwana, 1911
Aleurocanthus splendens David & Subramaniam, 1976
Aleurocanthus strychnosicola Cohic, 1966
Aleurocanthus terminaliae Dubey & Sundararaj, 2004
Aleurocanthus trispina Mound, 1965
Aleurocanthus t-signatus Maskell, 1896
Aleurocanthus valenciae Martin & Carver in Martin, 1999
Aleurocanthus valparaiensis David & Subramaniam, 1976
Aleurocanthus vindhyachali Dubey & Sundararaj, 2004
Aleurocanthus voeltzkowi Newstead, 1908
Aleurocanthus woglumi Ashby, 1915
Aleurocanthus zizyphi Priesner & Hosny, 1934
Aleurocerus Bondar, 1923
Aleurocerus ceriferus Sampson & Drews, 1941
Aleurocerus chiclensis Russell, 1986
Aleurocerus coccolobae Russell, 1986
Aleurocerus colombiae Russell, 1986
Aleurocerus flavomarginatus Bondar, 1923
Aleurocerus luxuriosus Bondar, 1923
Aleurocerus musae Russell, 1986
Aleurocerus palmae Russell, 1986
Aleurocerus petiolicola Russell, 1986
Aleurocerus tumidosus Bondar, 1923
Aleurochiton Tullgren, 1907
Aleurochiton acerinus Haupt, 1934
Aleurochiton aceris Modeer, 1778
Aleurochiton forbesii Ashmead, 1893
Aleurochiton orientalis Danzig, 1966
Aleurochiton pseudoplatani Visnya, 1936
Aleuroclava Singh, 1931
Aleuroclava afriae Sundararaj & David, 1995
Aleuroclava angkorensis Takahashi, 1942
Aleuroclava artocarpi Corbett, 1935
Aleuroclava aucubae Kuwana, 1911
Aleuroclava ayyari Sundararaj & David, 1993
Aleuroclava baccaureae Corbett, 1935
Aleuroclava bauhiniae Corbett, 1935
Aleuroclava bifurcata Corbett, 1933
Aleuroclava bilineata Sundararaj & David, 1993
Aleuroclava bulbiformi Qureshi, 1982
Aleuroclava burmanicus Singh, 1938
Aleuroclava calicutensis Dubey & Sundararaj, 2005
Aleuroclava calycopteriseae Dubey & Sundararaj, 2005
Aleuroclava canangae Corbett, 1935
Aleuroclava cardamomi David & Subramaniam, 1976
Aleuroclava carpini Takahashi, 1939
Aleuroclava cinnamomi Jesudasan & David, 1991
Aleuroclava citri Jesudasan & David, 1991
Aleuroclava citrifolii Corbett, 1935
Aleuroclava complex Singh, 1931
Aleuroclava cordii Qureshi, 1982
Aleuroclava davidi Qureshi, 1982
Aleuroclava dehradunensis Jesudasan & David, 1991
Aleuroclava doddabettaensis Dubey & Sundararaj, 2005
Aleuroclava doveri Corbett, 1935
Aleuroclava dubius Bink-Moenen, 1983
Aleuroclava ehretiae Jesudasan & David, 1991
Aleuroclava elatostemae Takahashi, 1932
Aleuroclava erythrinae Corbett, 1935
Aleuroclava eugeniae Corbett, 1935
Aleuroclava euphoriae Takahashi, 1942
Aleuroclava euryae Kuwana, 1911
Aleuroclava evanantiae Jesudasan & David, 1991
Aleuroclava fici Corbett, 1935
Aleuroclava ficicola Takahashi, 1932
Aleuroclava filamentosa Corbett, 1933
Aleuroclava flabellus Takahashi, 1949
Aleuroclava fletcheri Sundararaj & David, 1992
Aleuroclava goaensis Jesudasan & David, 1991
Aleuroclava gordoniae Takahashi, 1932
Aleuroclava grewiae Sundararaj & David, 1993
Aleuroclava guyavae Takahashi, 1932
Aleuroclava hexcantha Singh, 1940
Aleuroclava hikosanensis Takahashi, 1938
Aleuroclava hindustanicus Meganathan & David, 1994
Aleuroclava indicus Singh, 1931
Aleuroclava jasmini Takahashi, 1932
Aleuroclava kanyakumariensis Sundararaj & David, 1993
Aleuroclava kavalurensis Jesudasan & David, 1991
Aleuroclava kerala Martin & Mound, 2007
Aleuroclava kudremukhensis Dubey & Sundararaj, 2005
Aleuroclava kuwanai Takahashi, 1934
Aleuroclava lagerstroemiae Takahashi, 1934
Aleuroclava lanceolata Takahashi, 1949
Aleuroclava latus Takahashi, 1934
Aleuroclava lefroyi Sundararaj & David, 1993
Aleuroclava lithocarpi Takahashi, 1934
Aleuroclava longisetosus Jesudasan & David, 1991
Aleuroclava longispinus Takahashi, 1934
Aleuroclava louiseae Sundararaj & David, 1993
Aleuroclava macarangae Corbett, 1935
Aleuroclava madhucae Jesudasan & David, 1991
Aleuroclava magnoliae Takahashi, 1952
Aleuroclava malloti Takahashi, 1932
Aleuroclava manii David, 1978
Aleuroclava martini Dubey & Sundararaj, 2005
Aleuroclava maximus Qureshi, 1982
Aleuroclava melastomae Takahashi, 1934
Aleuroclava meliosmae Takahashi, 1932
Aleuroclava montanus Takahashi, 1939
Aleuroclava multipori Takahashi, 1935
Aleuroclava multituberculata Sundararaj & David, 1993
Aleuroclava murrayae Singh, 1931
Aleuroclava mysorensis Jesudasan & David, 1991
Aleuroclava nachiensis Takahashi, 1963
Aleuroclava nagercoilensis Sundararaj & David, 1993
Aleuroclava nanjangudensis Jesudasan & David, 1991
Aleuroclava neolitseae Takahashi, 1934
Aleuroclava nephelii Corbett, 1935
Aleuroclava nigeriae Mound, 1965
Aleuroclava nitidus Singh, 1932
Aleuroclava orientalis David & Jesudasan, 1988
Aleuroclava papillata Sundararaj & Dubey, 2004
Aleuroclava parvus Singh, 1938
Aleuroclava pentatuberculata Sundararaj & David, 1993
Aleuroclava philomenae Jesudasan & David, 1991
Aleuroclava phyllanthi Corbett, 1935
Aleuroclava piperis Takahashi, 1935
Aleuroclava pongamiae Jesudasan & David, 1991
Aleuroclava porosus Priesner & Hosny, 1937
Aleuroclava psidii Singh, 1931
Aleuroclava pulcherrimus Corbett, 1935
Aleuroclava pyracanthae Takahashi, 1933
Aleuroclava ramachandrani Dubey & Sundararaj, 2005
Aleuroclava regui Sundararaj & David, 1993
Aleuroclava rhododendri Takahashi, 1935
Aleuroclava saputarensis Sundararaj & David, 1993
Aleuroclava selvakumarani Sundararaj & David, 1993
Aleuroclava sepangensis Martin & Mound, 2007
Aleuroclava siamensis Takahashi, 1942
Aleuroclava similis Takahashi, 1938
Aleuroclava simplex Takahashi, 1949
Aleuroclava singhi Jesudasan & David, 1991
Aleuroclava sivakasiensis Sundararaj & David, 1993
Aleuroclava srilankaensis David, 1993
Aleuroclava stereospermi Corbett, 1935
Aleuroclava subindica Martin & Mound, 2007
Aleuroclava submarginatus Qureshi, 1982
Aleuroclava takahashii David & Subramaniam, 1976
Aleuroclava tarennae Martin & Mound, 2007
Aleuroclava tentaculiformis Corbett, 1935
Aleuroclava terminaliae Sundararaj & David, 1993
Aleuroclava thysanospermi Takahashi, 1934
Aleuroclava trachelospermi Takahashi, 1938
Aleuroclava trilineata Sundararaj & David, 1993
Aleuroclava tripori Dubey & Sundararaj, 2006
Aleuroclava trochodendri Takahashi, 1957
Aleuroclava ubonensis Takahashi, 1942
Aleuroclava uraianus Takahashi, 1932
Aleuroclava vernoniae Meganathan & David, 1994
Aleuroclava vitexae Sundararaj & David, 1993
Aleuroclava wrightiae Jesudasan & David, 1991
Aleurocybotus Quaintance & Baker, 1914
Aleurocybotus cereus Martin, 2005
Aleurocybotus graminicolus Quaintance, 1899
Aleurocybotus occiduus Russell, 1964
Aleurocyperus Ko & Dubey, 2007
Aleurocyperus humus Ko & Dubey, 2007
Aleuroduplidens Martin, 1999
Aleuroduplidens carverae Martin, 1999
Aleuroduplidens croceata Maskell, 1896
Aleuroduplidens eucalyptifolia Martin, 1999
Aleuroduplidens santali Martin, 1999
Aleuroduplidens triangularis Martin, 1999
Aleuroduplidens wellsae Martin, 1999
Aleuroglandulus Bondar, 1923
Aleuroglandulus inanis Martin, 2005
Aleuroglandulus magnus Russell, 1944
Aleuroglandulus striatus Sampson & Drews, 1941
Aleuroglandulus subtilis Bondar, 1923
Aleuroinanis Martin, 1999
Aleuroinanis myrtacei Martin, 1999
Aleurolobus Quaintance & Baker, 1914
Aleurolobus acanthi Takahashi, 1936
Aleurolobus antennata Regu & David, 1993
Aleurolobus azadirachtae Regu & David, 1993
Aleurolobus azimae Jesudasan & David, 1991
Aleurolobus barleriae Jesudasan & David, 1991
Aleurolobus barodensis Maskell, 1896
Aleurolobus bidentatus Singh, 1940
Aleurolobus burliarensis Jesudasan & David, 1991
Aleurolobus cassiae Jesudasan & David, 1991
Aleurolobus cephalidistinctus Regu & David, 1993
Aleurolobus cissampelosae Regu & David, 1993
Aleurolobus cohici Regu & David, 1993
Aleurolobus confusus David & Subramaniam, 1976
Aleurolobus dalbergiae Dubey & Sundararaj, 2006
Aleurolobus delamarei Cohic, 1969
Aleurolobus delhiensis Regu & David, 1993
Aleurolobus diacritica Regu & David, 1993
Aleurolobus diastematus Bink-Moenen, 1983
Aleurolobus distinctus Regu & David, 1993
Aleurolobus exceptionalis Regu & David, 1993
Aleurolobus flavus Quaintance & Baker, 1917
Aleurolobus fouabii Cohic, 1969
Aleurolobus graminicola Bink-Moenen, 1983
Aleurolobus greeni Corbett, 1926
Aleurolobus gruveli Cohic, 1968
Aleurolobus hargreavesi Dozier, 1934
Aleurolobus hederae Takahashi, 1935
Aleurolobus hosurensis Regu & David, 1993
Aleurolobus indigoferae Regu & David, 1993
Aleurolobus iteae Takahashi, 1957
Aleurolobus japonicus Takahashi, 1954
Aleurolobus jullieni Cohic, 1968
Aleurolobus karunkuliensis Jesudasan & David, 1991
Aleurolobus lagerstroemiae Regu & David, 1993
Aleurolobus longisetosus Dubey & Sundararaj, 2006
Aleurolobus luci Cohic, 1969
Aleurolobus macarangae Regu & David, 1993
Aleurolobus madrasensis Regu & David, 1993
Aleurolobus marlatti Quaintance, 1903
Aleurolobus mauritanicus Cohic, 1969
Aleurolobus moundi David & Subramaniam, 1976
Aleurolobus musae Corbett, 1935
Aleurolobus nagercoilensis Regu & David, 1993
Aleurolobus olivinus Silvestri, 1911
Aleurolobus onitshae Mound, 1965
Aleurolobus oplismeni Takahashi, 1931
Aleurolobus orientalis David & Jesudasan, 1988
Aleurolobus osmanthi Young, 1944
Aleurolobus ovalis Regu & David, 1993
Aleurolobus padappaiensis Regu & David, 1993
Aleurolobus panvelensis Regu & David, 1993
Aleurolobus patchlily Regu & David, 1993
Aleurolobus pauliani Cohic, 1969
Aleurolobus philippinensis Quaintance & Baker, 1917
Aleurolobus piliostigmatos Bink-Moenen, 1983
Aleurolobus psidii Jesudasan & David, 1991
Aleurolobus rhachisphora Regu & David, 1993
Aleurolobus rhododendri Takahashi, 1934
Aleurolobus riveae Regu & David, 1993
Aleurolobus russellae Regu & David, 1993
Aleurolobus sairandhryensis Meganathan & David, 1994
Aleurolobus saklespurensis Regu & David, 1993
Aleurolobus saputarensis Regu & David, 1993
Aleurolobus scolopiae Takahashi, 1933
Aleurolobus selangorensis Corbett, 1935
Aleurolobus setigerus Quaintance & Baker, 1917
Aleurolobus shiiae Takahashi, 1957
Aleurolobus singhi Regu & David, 1993
Aleurolobus solitarius Quaintance & Baker, 1917
Aleurolobus spinosus Jesudasan & David, 1991
Aleurolobus sterculiae Jesudasan & David, 1991
Aleurolobus styraci Takahashi, 1954
Aleurolobus subrotundus Silvestri, 1927
Aleurolobus sundararaji Regu & David, 1993
Aleurolobus szechwanensis Young, 1942
Aleurolobus taonabae Kuwana, 1911
Aleurolobus tassellatus Regu & David, 1993
Aleurolobus tchadiensis Bink-Moenen, 1983
Aleurolobus teucrii Mifsud & Palmeri, 1996
Aleurolobus tuberculatus Regu & David, 1993
Aleurolobus valparaiensis Jesudasan & David, 1991
Aleurolobus vitis Danzig, 1966
Aleurolobus walayarensis Jesudasan & David, 1991
Aleurolobus wunni Ryberg, 1938
Aleurolonga Mound, 1965
Aleurolonga cassiae Mound, 1965
Aleuromarginatus Corbett, 1935
Aleuromarginatus bauhiniae Corbett, 1935
Aleuromarginatus corbettiaformis Martin, 1985
Aleuromarginatus dalbergiae Cohic, 1969
Aleuromarginatus kallarensis David & Subramaniam, 1976
Aleuromarginatus littoralis Martin, 1985
Aleuromarginatus marginiquus Martin, 1999
Aleuromarginatus millettiae Cohic, 1968
Aleuromarginatus moundi Martin, 1999
Aleuromarginatus nemciae Martin, 1999
Aleuromarginatus nigrus Martin, 1999
Aleuromarginatus serdangensis Takahashi, 1955
Aleuromarginatus shihmenensis Ko in Ko, Hsu & Wu, 1995
Aleuromarginatus tephrosiae Corbett, 1935
Aleuromarginatus thirumurthiensis David, 1988
Aleuropapillatus Regu & David, 1993
Aleuropapillatus gmelinae David, Jesudasan & Mathew, 1988
Aleuropapillatus kumariensis Regu & David, 1993
Aleuroparadoxus Quaintance & Baker, 1914
Aleuroparadoxus arctostaphyli Russell, 1947
Aleuroparadoxus chomeliae Russell, 1947
Aleuroparadoxus gardeniae Russell, 1947
Aleuroparadoxus ilicicola Russell, 1947
Aleuroparadoxus iridescens Bemis, 1904
Aleuroparadoxus punctatus Quaintance & Baker, 1917
Aleuroparadoxus rhodae Russell, 1947
Aleuroparadoxus sapotae Russell, 1947
Aleuroparadoxus trinidadensis Russell, 1947
Aleuroparadoxus truncatus Russell, 1947
Aleuroplatus Quaintance & Baker, 1914
Aleuroplatus acaciae Bink-Moenen, 1983
Aleuroplatus affinis Takahashi, 1961
Aleuroplatus agauriae Takahashi, 1955
Aleuroplatus akeassii Cohic, 1969
Aleuroplatus alcocki Peal, 1903
Aleuroplatus alpinus Takahashi, 1955
Aleuroplatus anapatsae Takahashi, 1951
Aleuroplatus berbericolus Quaintance & Baker, 1917
Aleuroplatus bignoniae Russell, 1944
Aleuroplatus biluminiporus Martin & Malumphy, 2002
Aleuroplatus bossi Takahashi, 1936
Aleuroplatus cadabae Priesner & Hosny, 1934
Aleuroplatus claricephalus Takahashi, 1940
Aleuroplatus cockerelli von Ihering, 1897
Aleuroplatus cococolus Quaintance & Baker, 1917
Aleuroplatus coronata Quaintance, 1900
Aleuroplatus daitoensis Takahashi, 1940
Aleuroplatus dentatus Sampson & Drews, 1941
Aleuroplatus dorsipallidus Martin, 1988
Aleuroplatus dubius Takahashi, 1955
Aleuroplatus elmarae Mound & Halsey, 1978
Aleuroplatus epigaeae Russell, 1944
Aleuroplatus evodiae Takahashi, 1960
Aleuroplatus fici Takahashi, 1932
Aleuroplatus ficifolii Takahashi, 1942
Aleuroplatus ficusrugosae Quaintance & Baker, 1917
Aleuroplatus gelatinosus Cockerell, 1898
Aleuroplatus graphicus Bondar, 1923
Aleuroplatus hiezi Cohic, 1968
Aleuroplatus hoyae Peal, 1903
Aleuroplatus ilicis Russell, 1944
Aleuroplatus incisus Quaintance & Baker, 1917
Aleuroplatus incurvatus Takahashi, 1961
Aleuroplatus insularis Takahashi, 1941
Aleuroplatus joholensis Corbett, 1935
Aleuroplatus lateralis Bondar, 1923
Aleuroplatus latus Takahashi, 1939
Aleuroplatus liquidambaris Takahashi, 1941
Aleuroplatus magnoliae Russell, 1944
Aleuroplatus malayanus Takahashi, 1955
Aleuroplatus mameti Takahashi, 1937
Aleuroplatus manjakaensis Takahashi, 1955
Aleuroplatus multipori Takahashi, 1940
Aleuroplatus myricae Quaintance & Baker, 1917
Aleuroplatus mysorensis David & Subramaniam, 1976
Aleuroplatus neovatus Takahashi, 1961
Aleuroplatus oculiminutus Quaintance & Baker, 1917
Aleuroplatus oculireniformis Quaintance & Baker, 1917
Aleuroplatus ovatus Quaintance & Baker, 1917
Aleuroplatus panamensis Sampson & Drews, 1941
Aleuroplatus pauliani Takahashi, 1955
Aleuroplatus pectiniferus Quaintance & Baker, 1917
Aleuroplatus periplocae Dozier, 1934
Aleuroplatus perseaphagus Martin, Aguiar & Pita, 1996
Aleuroplatus pileae Takahashi, 1939
Aleuroplatus plumosus Quaintance, 1900
Aleuroplatus polystachyae Takahashi, 1955
Aleuroplatus premnae Corbett, 1926
Aleuroplatus quaintancei Peal, 1903
Aleuroplatus quercusaquaticae Quaintance, 1900
Aleuroplatus robinsoni Takahashi, 1955
Aleuroplatus sculpturatus Quaintance & Baker, 1917
Aleuroplatus semiplumosus Russell, 1944
Aleuroplatus serratus Takahashi, 1955
Aleuroplatus sinepecten Singh, 1945
Aleuroplatus spina Singh, 1931
Aleuroplatus stellatus Hempel, 1922
Aleuroplatus subrotundus Takahashi, 1938
Aleuroplatus translucidus Quaintance & Baker, 1917
Aleuroplatus tsibabenae Takahashi, 1955
Aleuroplatus tsimananensis Takahashi, 1955
Aleuroplatus tuberculatus Takahashi, 1951
Aleuroplatus vaccinii Russell, 1944
Aleuroplatus validus Quaintance & Baker, 1917
Aleuroplatus variegatus Quaintance & Baker, 1917
Aleuroplatus vinsoniodes Cockerell, 1898
Aleuroplatus weinmanniae Takahashi, 1951
Aleuropleurocelus Drews & Sampson, 1956
Aleuropleurocelus abnormis Quaintance, 1900
Aleuropleurocelus acaudatus Drews & Sampson, 1958
Aleuropleurocelus ceanothi Sampson, 1945
Aleuropleurocelus cecropiae Bondar, 1923
Aleuropleurocelus coachellensis Drews & Sampson, 1958
Aleuropleurocelus granulata Sampson & Drews, 1941
Aleuropleurocelus laingi Drews & Sampson, 1956
Aleuropleurocelus nigrans Bemis, 1904
Aleuropleurocelus oblanceolatus Drews & Sampson, 1958
Aleuropleurocelus ornatus Drews & Sampson, 1958
Aleuropleurocelus rotunda J. M. Baker, 1937
Aleuropleurocelus sierrae Sampson, 1945
Aleuroporosus Corbett, 1935
Aleuroporosus lumpurensis Corbett, 1935
Aleuropteridis Mound, 1961
Aleuropteridis eastopi Mound, 1961
Aleuropteridis filicicola Newstead, 1911
Aleuropteridis hargreavesi Mound, 1961
Aleuropteridis jamesi Mound, 1961
Aleuroputeus Corbett, 1935
Aleuroputeus baccaureae Corbett, 1935
Aleuroputeus perseae Corbett, 1935
Aleurothrixus Quaintance & Baker, 1914
Aleurothrixus aepim Goeldi, 1886
Aleurothrixus aguiari Costa Lima, 1942
Aleurothrixus antidesmae Takahashi, 1933
Aleurothrixus bondari Costa Lima, 1942
Aleurothrixus chivelensis Sampson & Drews, 1941
Aleurothrixus floccosus Maskell, 1896
Aleurothrixus guareae Costa Lima, 1942
Aleurothrixus guimaraesi Costa Lima, 1942
Aleurothrixus interrogationis Bemis, 1904
Aleurothrixus lucumai Costa Lima, 1942
Aleurothrixus miconiae Hempel, 1922
Aleurothrixus myrtacei Bondar, 1923
Aleurothrixus myrtifolii Bondar, 1923
Aleurothrixus ondinae Bondar, 1923
Aleurothrixus porteri Quaintance & Baker, 1916
Aleurothrixus proximans Bondar, 1923
Aleurothrixus silvestris Corbett, 1935
Aleurothrixus similis Sampson & Drews, 1941
Aleurothrixus smilaceti Takahashi, 1934
Aleurothrixus solani Bondar, 1923
Aleurotithius Quaintance & Baker, 1914
Aleurotithius mexicanus Russell, 1947
Aleurotithius timberlakei Quaintance & Baker, 1914
Aleurotrachelus Quaintance & Baker, 1914
Aleurotrachelus alpinus Takahashi, 1940
Aleurotrachelus ambrensis Takahashi & Mamet, 1952
Aleurotrachelus ampullatus Bink-Moenen, 1983
Aleurotrachelus anonae Corbett, 1935
Aleurotrachelus asparagi Lewis, 1893
Aleurotrachelus atratus Hempel, 1922
Aleurotrachelus brazzavillense Cohic, 1968
Aleurotrachelus camamuensis Bondar, 1923
Aleurotrachelus camelliae Kuwana, 1911
Aleurotrachelus chikungensis Mound & Halsey, 1978
Aleurotrachelus corbetti Takahashi, 1941
Aleurotrachelus debregeasiae Young, 1944
Aleurotrachelus distinctus Hempel, 1922
Aleurotrachelus dryandrae Solomon, 1935
Aleurotrachelus duplicatus Bink-Moenen, 1983
Aleurotrachelus elatostemae Takahashi, 1932
Aleurotrachelus eriosemae Hempel, 1922
Aleurotrachelus erythrinae Corbett, 1935
Aleurotrachelus euphorifoliae Young, 1944
Aleurotrachelus fenestellae Hempel, 1922
Aleurotrachelus filamentosus Takahashi, 1938
Aleurotrachelus fissistigmae Takahashi, 1931
Aleurotrachelus globulariae Goux, 1942
Aleurotrachelus granosus Bondar, 1923
Aleurotrachelus gratiosus Bondar, 1923
Aleurotrachelus grewiae Takahashi, 1952
Aleurotrachelus hazomiavonae Takahashi, 1955
Aleurotrachelus ingafolii Bondar, 1923
Aleurotrachelus ishigakiensis Takahashi, 1933
Aleurotrachelus joholensis Corbett, 1935
Aleurotrachelus juiyunensis Young, 1944
Aleurotrachelus limbatus Maskell, 1896
Aleurotrachelus longispinus Corbett, 1926
Aleurotrachelus lumpurensis Corbett, 1935
Aleurotrachelus machili Takahashi, 1942
Aleurotrachelus madagascariensis Takahashi, 1955
Aleurotrachelus maesae Takahashi, 1935
Aleurotrachelus marginata Newstead, 1911
Aleurotrachelus mauritiensis Takahashi, 1940
Aleurotrachelus mesuae Corbett, 1935
Aleurotrachelus minimus Young, 1944
Aleurotrachelus minutus Takahashi, 1952
Aleurotrachelus multipapillus Singh, 1932
Aleurotrachelus nivetae Cohic, 1969
Aleurotrachelus obscurus Bink-Moenen, 1983
Aleurotrachelus orchidicola Takahashi, 1939
Aleurotrachelus oriani Martin & Mound, 2007
Aleurotrachelus pandani Takahashi, 1951
Aleurotrachelus papilliferus Sampson & Drews, 1941
Aleurotrachelus parvus Hempel, 1899
Aleurotrachelus pauliani Takahashi, 1960
Aleurotrachelus plectroniae Takahashi, 1955
Aleurotrachelus primitus Young, 1944
Aleurotrachelus pyracanthae Takahashi, 1935
Aleurotrachelus reunionensis Takahashi, 1960
Aleurotrachelus rhamnicola Goux, 1940
Aleurotrachelus rosarius Bondar, 1923
Aleurotrachelus rotundus Corbett, 1935
Aleurotrachelus rubi Takahashi, 1933
Aleurotrachelus rubromaculatus Bondar, 1923
Aleurotrachelus selangorensis Corbett, 1935
Aleurotrachelus serratus Takahashi, 1949
Aleurotrachelus socialis Bondar, 1923
Aleurotrachelus souliei Cohic, 1969
Aleurotrachelus stypheliae Maskell, 1896
Aleurotrachelus taiwanus Takahashi, 1932
Aleurotrachelus tarennae Bink-Moenen, 1983
Aleurotrachelus theobromae Bondar, 1923
Aleurotrachelus tracheifer Quaintance, 1900
Aleurotrachelus trachoides Back, 1912
Aleurotrachelus tuberculatus Singh, 1933
Aleurotrachelus urticicola Young, 1944
Aleurotrachelus vitis Corbett, 1935
Aleurotrachelus zonatus Takahashi, 1952
Aleurotuba Tremblay & Iaccarino, 1978
Aleurotuba replaced by Aleurotuba Tremblay & Iaccarino, 1978.
Aleurotuba jelinekii Frauenfeld, 1867
Aleurotulus Quaintance & Baker, 1914
Aleurotulus anthuricola Nakahara, 1989
Aleurotulus arundinacea Singh, 1931
Aleurotulus laneus Martin, 2005
Aleurotulus mundururu Bondar, 1923
Aleurotulus nephrolepidis Quaintance, 1900
Aleurotulus pteridophytae Martin in Mound, Martin & Polaszek, 1994
Aleuroviggianus Iaccarino, 1982
Aleuroviggianus adanaensis Bink-Moenen, 1992
Aleuroviggianus adrianae Iaccarino, 1982
Aleuroviggianus graecus Bink-Moenen, 1992
Aleuroviggianus halperini Bink-Moenen, 1992
Aleuroviggianus polymorphus Bink-Moenen, 1992
Aleuroviggianus zonalus Bink-Moenen, 1992
Aleurovitreus Martin, 2005
Aleurovitreus insignis Bondar, 1923
Aleurovitreus risor Martin, 2005
Aleyrodes Latreille, 1796
Aleyrodes albescens Hempel, 1922
Aleyrodes amnicola Bemis, 1904
Aleyrodes asari Schrank, 1801
Aleyrodes asarumis Shimer, 1867
Aleyrodes aureocincta Cockerell, 1897
Aleyrodes baja Sampson, 1943
Aleyrodes ciliatus Takahashi, 1955
Aleyrodes crataegi Kiriukhin, 1947
Aleyrodes diasemus Bemis, 1904
Aleyrodes elevatus Silvestri, 1934
Aleyrodes essigi Penny, 1922
Aleyrodes fodiens Maskell, 1896
Aleyrodes gossypii Fitch, 1857
Aleyrodes hyperici Corbett, 1926
Aleyrodes japonicus Takahashi, 1963
Aleyrodes lacteus Zehntner, 1897
Aleyrodes latus Hempel, 1922
Aleyrodes lonicerae Walker, 1852
Aleyrodes millettiae Cohic, 1968
Aleyrodes osmaroniae Sampson, 1945
Aleyrodes philadelphi Danzig, 1966
Aleyrodes proletella Linnaeus, 1758
Aleyrodes pruinosus Bemis, 1904
Aleyrodes pyrolae Gillette & Baker, 1895
Aleyrodes shizuokensis Kuwana, 1911
Aleyrodes singularis Danzig, 1966
Aleyrodes sorini Takahashi, 1958
Aleyrodes spiraeoides Quaintance, 1900
Aleyrodes taiheisanus Takahashi, 1939
Aleyrodes takahashii Ossiannilsson, 1966
Aleyrodes tinaeoides Blanchard, 1852
Aleyrodes winterae Takahashi, 1937
Aleyrodes zygia Danzig, 1966
Aleyrodiella Danzig, 1966
Aleyrodiella lamellifera Danzig, 1966
Anomaleyrodes Takahashi & Mamet, 1952
Anomaleyrodes palmae Takahashi & Mamet, 1952
Apobemisia Takahashi, 1954
Apobemisia celti Takahashi, 1932
Apobemisia kuwanai Takahashi, 1934
Arachnaleyrodes Bink-Moenen, 1983
Arachnaleyrodes insignis Bink-Moenen, 1983
Asialeyrodes Corbett, 1935
Asialeyrodes corbetti Takahashi, 1949
Asialeyrodes dorsidemarcata Singh, 1932
Asialeyrodes dubius Martin & Mound, 2007
Asialeyrodes elegans Meganathan & David, 1994
Asialeyrodes euphoriae Takahashi, 1942
Asialeyrodes indica Sundararaj & David, 1992
Asialeyrodes lumpurensis Corbett, 1935
Asialeyrodes lushanensis Ko in Ko, Hsu & Wu, 1993
Asialeyrodes maesae Takahashi, 1934
Asialeyrodes meghalayensis Regu & David, 1992
Asialeyrodes menoni Meganathan & David, 1994
Asialeyrodes multipori Takahashi, 1942
Asialeyrodes papillatus Regu & David, 1992
Asialeyrodes saklespurensis Regu & David, 1993
Asialeyrodes selangorensis Corbett, 1935
Asialeyrodes sphaerica Sundararaj & Dubey, 2006
Asialeyrodes splendens Meganathan & David, 1994
Asterobemisia Trehan, 1940
Asterobemisia atraphaxius Danzig, 1969
Asterobemisia carpini Koch, 1857
Asterobemisia curvata Qureshi, 1981
Asterobemisia dentata Danzig, 1969
Asterobemisia lata Danzig, 1966
Asterobemisia obenbergeri Zahradnik, 1961
Asterobemisia paveli Zahradnik, 1961
Asterobemisia salicaria Danzig, 1969
Asterobemisia silvatica Danzig, 1964
Asterobemisia takahashii Danzig, 1966
Asterobemisia trifolii Danzig, 1966
Asterobemisia yanagicola Takahashi, 1934
Asterochiton Maskell, 1879
Asterochiton aureus Maskell, 1879
Asterochiton auricolor Bondar, 1923
Asterochiton cerata Maskell, 1896
Asterochiton cordiae David & Subramaniam, 1976
Asterochiton fagi Maskell, 1890
Asterochiton pittospori Dumbleton, 1957
Asterochiton simplex Maskell, 1890
Axacalia Danzig, 1969
Axacalia spiraeanthi Danzig, 1969
Bellitudo Russell, 1943
Bellitudo campae Russell, 1943
Bellitudo cubae Russell, 1943
Bellitudo hispaniolae Russell, 1943
Bellitudo jamaicae Russell, 1943
Bemisaleyrodes Cohic, 1969
Bemisaleyrodes balachowskyi Cohic, 1969
Bemisaleyrodes brideliae Bink-Moenen, 1983
Bemisaleyrodes grjebinei Cohic, 1968
Bemisaleyrodes pauliani Cohic, 1969
Bemisia Quaintance & Baker, 1914
Bemisia afer Priesner & Hosny, 1934
Bemisia alni Takahashi, 1957
Bemisia antennata Gameel, 1968
Bemisia bambusae Takahashi, 1942
Bemisia berbericola Cockerell, 1896
Bemisia capitata Regu & David, 1991
Bemisia caudasculptura Quaintance & Baker, 1937
Bemisia centroamericana Martin, 2005
Bemisia combreticula Bink-Moenen, 1983
Bemisia confusa Danzig, 1964
Bemisia cordylinidis Dumbleton, 1961
Bemisia decipiens Maskell, 1896
Bemisia elliptica Takahashi, 1960
Bemisia flocculosa Gill & Holder, 2011
Bemisia formosana Takahashi, 1933
Bemisia giffardi Kotinsky, 1907
Bemisia gigantea Martin, 1999
Bemisia grossa Singh, 1931
Bemisia guierae Bink-Moenen, 1983
Bemisia hirta Bink-Moenen, 1983
Bemisia lampangensis Takahashi, 1942
Bemisia lauracea Martin, Aguiar & Pita, 1996
Bemisia leakii Peal, 1903
Bemisia medinae Gomez-Menor, 1954
Bemisia mesasiatica Danzig, 1969
Bemisia moringae David & Subramaniam, 1976
Bemisia multituberculata Sundararaj & David, 1990
Bemisia ovata Goux, 1940
Bemisia poinsettiae Hempel, 1922
Bemisia pongamiae Takahashi, 1931
Bemisia porteri Corbett, 1935
Bemisia psiadiae Takahashi, 1955
Bemisia puerariae Takahashi, 1955
Bemisia religiosa Peal, 1903
Bemisia shinanoensis Kuwana, 1922
Bemisia spiraeae Young, 1944
Bemisia spiraeoides Mound & Halsey, 1978
Bemisia subdecipiens Martin, 1999
Bemisia sugonjaevi Danzig, 1969
Bemisia tabaci Gennadius, 1889
Bemisia tuberculata Bondar, 1923
Bemisiella Danzig, 1966
Bemisiella artemisiae Danzig, 1966
Bemisiella lespedezae Danzig, 1966
Brazzaleyrodes Cohic, 1966
Brazzaleyrodes eriococciformis Cohic, 1966
Bulgarialeurodes Corbett, 1936
Bulgarialeurodes cotesii Maskell, 1896
Calluneyrodes Zahradnik, 1961
Calluneyrodes callunae Ossiannilsson, 1947
Chitonaleyrodes Martin, 1999
Chitonaleyrodes canberrensis Martin, 1999
Cockerelliella Sundararaj & David, 1992
Cockerelliella adinandrae Corbett, 1935
Cockerelliella bladhiae Takahashi, 1931
Cockerelliella curcumae Corbett, 1935
Cockerelliella dehradunensis Jesudasan & David, 1991
Cockerelliella dioscoreae Sundararaj & David, 1992
Cockerelliella indica Sundararaj & David, 1992
Cockerelliella karmardini Corbett, 1935
Cockerelliella lumpurensis Corbett, 1935
Cockerelliella meghalayensis Sundararaj & David, 1992
Cockerelliella psidii Corbett, 1935
Cockerelliella quaintancei Sundararaj & David, 1992
Cockerelliella rhodamniae Corbett, 1935
Cockerelliella rotunda Regu & David, 1993
Cockerelliella sembilanensis Corbett, 1935
Cockerelliella somnathensis Sundararaj, 2000
Cockerelliella splendens Meganathan & David, 1994
Cockerelliella zingiberae Sundararaj & David, 1992
Cohicaleyrodes Bink-Moenen, 1983
Cohicaleyrodes alternans Cohic, 1966
Cohicaleyrodes blanzyi Cohic, 1968
Cohicaleyrodes crossopterygis Bink-Moenen, 1983
Cohicaleyrodes descarpentriesi Cohic, 1968
Cohicaleyrodes elongatus Meganathan & David, 1994
Cohicaleyrodes indicus David & Selvakumaran, 1987
Cohicaleyrodes jesudasani David, 2005
Cohicaleyrodes mappiae Selvakumaran & David, 1996
Cohicaleyrodes obscura Bink-Moenen, 1983
Cohicaleyrodes padminiae Phillips & Jesudasan in David, Jesudasan & Phillips, 2006
Cohicaleyrodes pauliani Cohic, 1968
Cohicaleyrodes platysepali Cohic, 1966
Cohicaleyrodes quadrilongispinae Bink-Moenen, 1983
Cohicaleyrodes recurvispinus Cohic, 1966
Cohicaleyrodes saklespurensis Regu & David, 1992
Cohicaleyrodes uvariae Cohic, 1968
Combesaleyrodes Cohic, 1966
Combesaleyrodes bouqueti Cohic, 1966
Combesaleyrodes tauffliebi Cohic, 1966
Corbettia Dozier, 1934
Corbettia bauhiniae Cohic, 1968
Corbettia graminis Mound, 1965
Corbettia grandis Russell, 1960
Corbettia isoberliniae Bink-Moenen, 1983
Corbettia lamottei Cohic, 1969
Corbettia lonchocarpi Bink-Moenen, 1983
Corbettia millettiacola Dozier, 1934
Corbettia pauliani Cohic, 1966
Corbettia tamarindi Takahashi, 1951
Crenidorsum Russell, 1945
Crenidorsum discussion of C. rubiae, below. Syn. nov.
Crenidorsum armatae Russell, 1945
Crenidorsum aroidephagus Martin & Aguiar in Martin, Aguiar & Baufeld, 2001
Crenidorsum binkae Jesudasan & David, 1991
Crenidorsum caerulescens Singh, 1931
Crenidorsum celebes Martin, 1988
Crenidorsum cinnamomi Jesudasan & David, 1991
Crenidorsum coimbatorensis David & Subramaniam, 1976
Crenidorsum commune Russell, 1945
Crenidorsum debordae Russell, 1945
Crenidorsum diaphanum Russell, 1945
Crenidorsum differens Russell, 1945
Crenidorsum goaensis Jesudasan & David, 1991
Crenidorsum lasangensis Martin, 1985
Crenidorsum leve Russell, 1945
Crenidorsum magnisetae Russell, 1945
Crenidorsum malpighiae Russell, 1945
Crenidorsum marginale Russell, 1945
Crenidorsum micheliae Takahashi, 1932
Crenidorsum millennium Martin, 1999
Crenidorsum morobensis Martin, 1985
Crenidorsum ornatum Russell, 1945
Crenidorsum pykarae Jesudasan & David, 1991
Crenidorsum rubiae P. M. M. David, 2000
Crenidorsum russellae P. M. M David & B. V. David, 2000
Crenidorsum stigmaphylli Russell, 1945
Crenidorsum tuberculatum Russell, 1945
Crenidorsum turpiniae Takahashi, 1932
Crenidorsum wendlandiae Jesudasan & David, 1991
Crescentaleyrodes David & Jesudasan, 1987
Crescentaleyrodes fumipennis Hempel, 1899
Crescentaleyrodes monodi Cohic, 1969
Crescentaleyrodes paulianae Cohic, 1969
Crescentaleyrodes semilunaris Corbett, 1926
Crescentaleyrodes vetiveriae Dubey & Ko, 2006
Cryptolingula Martin & Carver, 1999
Cryptolingula perplexa Martin & Carver in Martin, 1999
Davidiella Dubey & Sundararaj, 2005
Davidiella cinnamomi Dubey & Sundararaj, 2005
Dialeurodes Cockerell, 1902
Dialeurodes abbotabadiensis Qureshi, 1980
Dialeurodes adinobotris Corbett, 1935
Dialeurodes agalmae Takahashi, 1935
Dialeurodes angulata Corbett, 1935
Dialeurodes anjumi Qureshi, 1980
Dialeurodes ara Corbett, 1935
Dialeurodes armatus David & Subramaniam, 1976
Dialeurodes ayyanarensis Sundararaj & David, 1991
Dialeurodes bancoensis Ardaillon & Cohic, 1970
Dialeurodes bangkokana Takahashi, 1942
Dialeurodes bicornicauda Martin, 1999
Dialeurodes binkae Sundararaj & David, 1991
Dialeurodes biventralis Sundararaj & David, 1991
Dialeurodes buscki Quaintance & Baker, 1917
Dialeurodes canthiae Sundararaj & David, 1991
Dialeurodes celti Takahashi, 1942
Dialeurodes cephalidistinctus Singh, 1932
Dialeurodes cerifera Quaintance & Baker, 1917
Dialeurodes chiengsenana Takahashi, 1942
Dialeurodes cinnamomi Takahashi, 1932
Dialeurodes cinnamomicola Takahashi, 1937
Dialeurodes citri Ashmead, 1885
Dialeurodes citricola Young, 1942
Dialeurodes conocephali Corbett, 1935
Dialeurodes crescentata Corbett, 1935
Dialeurodes cyathispinifera Corbett, 1933
Dialeurodes daphniphylli Takahashi, 1932
Dialeurodes davidi Mound & Halsey, 1978
Dialeurodes decaspermi Martin, 1985
Dialeurodes delhiensis David & Sundararaj, 1992
Dialeurodes denticulatus Bondar, 1923
Dialeurodes dicksoni Corbett, 1935
Dialeurodes didymocarpi Corbett, 1935
Dialeurodes dissimilis Quaintance & Baker, 1917
Dialeurodes distincta Corbett, 1933
Dialeurodes drypetesi nomen novum.
Dialeurodes dubia Corbett, 1935
Dialeurodes dumbeaensis Dumbleton, 1961
Dialeurodes egregissima Sampson & Drews, 1941
Dialeurodes emarginata Mound, 1965
Dialeurodes endospermae Corbett, 1935
Dialeurodes evodiae Corbett, 1935
Dialeurodes ficicola Takahashi, 1935
Dialeurodes gardeniae Corbett, 1935
Dialeurodes gemurohensis Corbett, 1935
Dialeurodes gigantica Sundararaj & David, 1991
Dialeurodes glutae Corbett, 1935
Dialeurodes granulata Sundararaj & David, 1991
Dialeurodes greenwoodi Corbett, 1936
Dialeurodes heterocera Bondar, 1923
Dialeurodes hexpuncta Singh, 1932
Dialeurodes hongkongensis Takahashi, 1941
Dialeurodes icfreae Sundararaj & Dubey, 2003
Dialeurodes imperialis Bondar, 1923
Dialeurodes indicus David & Subramaniam, 1976
Dialeurodes ixorae Singh, 1931
Dialeurodes joholensis Corbett, 1935
Dialeurodes kepongensis Corbett, 1935
Dialeurodes keralaensis Meganathan & David, 1994
Dialeurodes kirkaldyi Kotinsky, 1907
Dialeurodes kumargiriensis Sundararaj & Dubey, 2006
Dialeurodes lithocarpi Takahashi, 1931
Dialeurodes loranthi Corbett, 1926
Dialeurodes machilicola Takahashi, 1942
Dialeurodes maculatus Bondar, 1928
Dialeurodes maculipennis Bondar, 1923
Dialeurodes mahableshwarensis Sundararaj & David, 1998
Dialeurodes martini Sundararaj & David, 1991
Dialeurodes maxima Quaintance & Baker, 1917
Dialeurodes minahassai Martin, 1988
Dialeurodes mirabilis Takahashi, 1942
Dialeurodes musae Corbett, 1935
Dialeurodes nagpurensis Sundararaj & David, 1991
Dialeurodes natickis Baker & Moles, 1921
Dialeurodes navarroi Bondar, 1928
Dialeurodes nigeriae Cohic, 1966
Dialeurodes octoplicata Corbett, 1935
Dialeurodes ouchii Takahashi, 1937
Dialeurodes oweni Singh, 1932
Dialeurodes palmata Sundararaj & David, 1991
Dialeurodes panacis Corbett, 1935
Dialeurodes papulae Singh, 1932
Dialeurodes pauliani Cohic, 1966
Dialeurodes philippinensis Takahashi, 1936
Dialeurodes pilahensis Corbett, 1935
Dialeurodes platicus Bondar, 1923
Dialeurodes polymorpha Bink-Moenen, 1983
Dialeurodes pseudocitri Takahashi, 1942
Dialeurodes psychotriae Dumbleton, 1961
Dialeurodes punctata Corbett, 1933
Dialeurodes radiilinealis Quaintance & Baker, 1917
Dialeurodes radiipuncta Quaintance & Baker, 1917
Dialeurodes ramadeviae Dubey & Sundararaj, 2004
Dialeurodes rangooni Singh, 1932
Dialeurodes razalyi Corbett, 1935
Dialeurodes rempangensis Takahashi, 1949
Dialeurodes rengas Corbett, 1935
Dialeurodes reticulosa Corbett, 1935
Dialeurodes rotunda Singh, 1931
Dialeurodes rubiphaga Dubey & Sundararaj, 2004
Dialeurodes russellae Sundararaj & David, 1991
Dialeurodes saklaspurensis David, 1976
Dialeurodes saklespurensis Regu & David, 1993
Dialeurodes sandorici Corbett, 1935
Dialeurodes sepangensis Corbett, 1935
Dialeurodes sheryli P. M. M. David, 2000
Dialeurodes shintenensis Takahashi, 1933
Dialeurodes shoreae Corbett, 1933
Dialeurodes siemriepensis Takahashi, 1942
Dialeurodes simmondsi Corbett, 1927
Dialeurodes striata Corbett, 1935
Dialeurodes struthanthi Hempel, 1901
Dialeurodes sundararajani Sundararaj & Dubey, 2006
Dialeurodes tanakai Takahashi, 1942
Dialeurodes townsendi Quaintance & Baker, 1917
Dialeurodes tricolor Quaintance & Baker, 1917
Dialeurodes tuberculosa Corbett, 1935
Dialeurodes turpiniae Meganathan & David, 1994
Dialeurodes vitis Corbett, 1935
Dialeurodes vulgaris Singh, 1931
Dialeurodes wendlandiae Meganathan & David, 1994
Dialeurodes yercaudensis Jesudasan & David, 1991
Dialeurolobus Danzig, 1964
Dialeurolobus erythrinae Corbett, 1935
Dialeurolobus pulcher Danzig, 1964
Dialeurolobus rhamni Bink-Moenen in Bink-Moenen & Gerling, 1992
Dialeurolonga Dozier, 1928
Dialeurolonga elevated to generic rank by Takahashi, 1951
Dialeurolonga africana Newstead, 1921
Dialeurolonga agauriae Takahashi, 1951
Dialeurolonga ambilaensis Takahashi, 1955
Dialeurolonga angustata Takahashi, 1961
Dialeurolonga aphloiae Takahashi, 1955
Dialeurolonga bambusae Takahashi, 1961
Dialeurolonga bambusicola Takahashi, 1951
Dialeurolonga brevispina Takahashi, 1951
Dialeurolonga communis Bink-Moenen, 1983
Dialeurolonga davidi Dubey & Sundararaj, 2006
Dialeurolonga elliptica Takahashi, 1955
Dialeurolonga elongata Dozier, 1928
Dialeurolonga erythroxylonis Takahashi, 1955
Dialeurolonga eugeniae Takahashi, 1951
Dialeurolonga graminis Takahashi, 1951
Dialeurolonga guettardae Martin, 2005
Dialeurolonga hoyti Mound, 1965
Dialeurolonga kumargiriensis Dubey & Sundararaj, 2006
Dialeurolonga lagerstroemiae Jesudasan & David, 1991
Dialeurolonga lamtoensis Cohic, 1969
Dialeurolonga lata Takahashi, 1955
Dialeurolonga maculata Singh, 1931
Dialeurolonga malleshwaramensis Sundararaj, 2001
Dialeurolonga mameti Takahashi, 1955
Dialeurolonga mauritiensis Takahashi, 1938
Dialeurolonga milloti Takahashi, 1951
Dialeurolonga multipapilla Takahashi, 1955
Dialeurolonga multipori Dubey & Sundararaj, 2006
Dialeurolonga multituberculata Dubey & Sundararaj, 2006
Dialeurolonga nemoralis Bink-Moenen, 1983
Dialeurolonga nigra Takahashi & Mamet, 1952
Dialeurolonga operculobata Martin & Carver in Martin, 1999
Dialeurolonga paradoxa Takahashi, 1955
Dialeurolonga paucipapillata Cohic, 1969
Dialeurolonga pauliani Takahashi, 1951
Dialeurolonga perinetensis Takahashi & Mamet, 1952
Dialeurolonga phyllarthronis Takahashi, 1955
Dialeurolonga pseudocephalidistincta Dubey & Sundararaj, 2006
Dialeurolonga ravensarae Takahashi & Mamet, 1952
Dialeurolonga rhamni Takahashi, 1961
Dialeurolonga robinsoni Takahashi & Mamet, 1952
Dialeurolonga rotunda Takahashi, 1961
Dialeurolonga rusostigmoides Martin, 1999
Dialeurolonga similis Takahashi, 1955
Dialeurolonga simplex Takahashi, 1955
Dialeurolonga strychnosicola Cohic, 1966
Dialeurolonga subrotunda Takahashi, 1955
Dialeurolonga swainei Martin, 1999
Dialeurolonga takahashii David & Jesudasan 1989
Dialeurolonga tambourissae Takahashi, 1955
Dialeurolonga tenella Takahashi, 1961
Dialeurolonga trialeuroides Takahashi & Mamet, 1952
Dialeurolonga vendranae Takahashi, 1961
Dialeuropora Quaintance & Baker, 1917
Dialeuropora bipunctata Corbett, 1933
Dialeuropora brideliae Takahashi, 1932
Dialeuropora centrosemae Corbett, 1935
Dialeuropora congoensis Cohic, 1966
Dialeuropora decempuncta Quaintance & Baker, 1917
Dialeuropora hassensanensis Takahashi, 1934
Dialeuropora heptapora Regu & David, 1992
Dialeuropora holboelliae Young, 1944
Dialeuropora indochinensis Takahashi, 1942
Dialeuropora jendera Corbett, 1935
Dialeuropora langsat Corbett, 1935
Dialeuropora malayensis Corbett, 1935
Dialeuropora mangiferae Corbett, 1935
Dialeuropora murrayae Takahashi, 1931
Dialeuropora papillata Cohic, 1966
Dialeuropora photiniana Chen, 1997
Dialeuropora portugaliae Cohic, 1966
Dialeuropora pterolobiae David & Subramaniam, 1976
Dialeuropora silvarum Corbett, 1935
Dialeuropora urticata Young, 1944
Dialeuropora viburni Takahashi, 1933
Dialeurotrachelus Takahashi, 1942
Dialeurotrachelus cambodiensis Takahashi, 1942
Disiphon Russell, 1993
Disiphon dubienus Bondar, 1923
Disiphon russellae Martin, 2005
Distinctaleyrodes Dubey & Sundararaj, 2006
Distinctaleyrodes setosus Dubey & Sundararaj, 2006
Dothioia Dumbleton, 1961
Dothioia bidentatus Dumbleton, 1961
Dumbletoniella Jesudasan & David, 1990
Dumbletoniella callistemoni Martin, 1999
Dumbletoniella ellipticae Dumbleton, 1956
Dumbletoniella eucalypti Dumbleton, 1957
Dumbletoniella pittospori Martin & Carver in Martin, 1999
Dumbletoniella rotunda Martin & Carver in Martin, 1999
Dumbletoniella xanthorrhoeae Martin, 1999
Editaaleyrodes David, 2005
Editaaleyrodes indicus David, 2005
Extensaleyrodes Bink-Moenen, 1983
Extensaleyrodes akureensis Mound, 1965
Extensaleyrodes falcata Bink-Moenen, 1983
Fascaleyrodes Bink-Moenen, 1983
Fascaleyrodes palmae Gameel, 1968
Fascaleyrodes rara Bink-Moenen, 1983
Filicaleyrodes Takahashi, 1962
Filicaleyrodes bosseri Takahashi, 1962
Filicaleyrodes williamsi Trehan, 1938
Fippataleyrodes Sundararaj & David, 1992
Fippataleyrodes cinnamomi Dubey & Sundararaj, 2005
Fippataleyrodes indica Sundararaj & David, 1992
Fippataleyrodes litseae Sundararaj & David, 1992
Fippataleyrodes multipori Dubey & Sundararaj, 2005
Fippataleyrodes yellapurensis Dubey & Sundararaj, 2005
Gagudjuia Martin, 1999
Gagudjuia allosyncarpiae Martin, 1999
Gomenella Dumbleton, 1961
Gomenella dryandrae Takahashi, 1950
Gomenella multipora Dumbleton, 1961
Gomenella reflexa Dumbleton, 1961
Harpaleyrodes Bink-Moenen, 1983
Harpaleyrodes, tuberculata Bink-Moenen, 1983
Hesperaleyrodes Sampson, 1943
Hesperaleyrodes michoacanensis Sampson, 1943
Heteraleyrodes Takahashi, 1942
Heteraleyrodes bambusae Takahashi, 1942
Heteraleyrodes bambusicola Takahashi, 1951
Heterobemisia Takahashi, 1957
Heterobemisia alba Takahashi, 1957
Indoaleyrodes David & Subramaniam, 1976
Indoaleyrodes glochidioni Martin & Carver in Martin, 1999
Indoaleyrodes laos Takahashi, 1942
Indoaleyrodes pseudoculatus Martin, 1985
Indoaleyrodes reticulata Dumbleton, 1961
Juglasaleyrodes Cohic, 1966
Juglasaleyrodes orstomensis Cohic, 1966
Keralaleyrodes Meganathan & David, 1994
Keralaleyrodes indicus Meganathan & David, 1994
Laingiella Corbett, 1926
Laingiella bambusae Corbett, 1926
Leucopogonella Dumbleton, 1961
Leucopogonella apectenata Dumbleton, 1961
Leucopogonella pallida Dumbleton, 1961
Leucopogonella simila Dumbleton, 1961
Leucopogonella sinuata Dumbleton, 1961
Lipaleyrodes Takahashi, 1962
Lipaleyrodes atriplex Froggatt, 1911
Lipaleyrodes breyniae Singh, 1931
Lipaleyrodes crossandrae David & Subramaniam, 1976
Lipaleyrodes emiliae Chen & Ko, 2006
Lipaleyrodes euphorbiae David & Subramaniam, 1976
Lipaleyrodes hargreavesi Corbett, 1935
Lipaleyrodes leguminicola Takahashi, 1942
Lipaleyrodes phyllanthi Takahashi, 1962
Lipaleyrodes vernoniae David & Thenmozhi, 1995
Malayaleyrodes Corbett, 1935
Malayaleyrodes lumpurensis Corbett, 1935
Marginaleyrodes Takahashi, 1961
Marginaleyrodes fanalae Takahashi, 1951
Marginaleyrodes fenestrata Takahashi, 1955
Marginaleyrodes ixorae Takahashi, 1961
Marginaleyrodes madagascariensis Takahashi, 1951
Marginaleyrodes tsinjoarivona Takahashi, 1955
Massilieurodes Goux, 1939
Massilieurodes elevated to generic rank by Jensen, 2001
Massilieurodes alabamensis Jensen, 2001
Massilieurodes americanus Jensen, 2001
Massilieurodes chittendeni Laing, 1928
Massilieurodes curiosa Jensen, 2001
Massilieurodes euryae Takahashi, 1940
Massilieurodes fici Takahashi, 1932
Massilieurodes formosensis Takahashi, 1933
Massilieurodes homonoiae Jesudasan & David, 1991
Massilieurodes kirishimensis Takahashi, 1963
Massilieurodes monticola Takahashi, 1932
Massilieurodes multipori Takahashi, 1932
Massilieurodes myricae Jensen, 2001
Massilieurodes rarasana Takahashi, 1934
Massilieurodes sakaki Takahashi, 1958
Massilieurodes setiger Goux, 1939
Metabemisia Takahashi, 1963
Metabemisia distylii Takahashi, 1963
Metabemisia filicis Mound, 1967
Metabemisia palawana Martin in Martin & Camus, 2001
Metaleyrodes Sampson, 1943
Metaleyrodes oceanica Takahashi, 1939
Minutaleyrodes Jesudasan & David, 1990
Minutaleyrodes cherasensis Corbett, 1935
Minutaleyrodes indicus Meganathan & David, 1994
Minutaleyrodes kolliensis David, 1977
Minutaleyrodes minuta Singh, 1931
Minutaleyrodes suishanus Takahashi, 1934
Mixaleyrodes Takahashi, 1936
Mixaleyrodes polypodicola Takahashi, 1963
Mixaleyrodes polystichi Takahashi, 1936
Nealeyrodes Hempel, 1922
Nealeyrodes bonariensis Hempel, 1922
Neoaleurodes Bondar, 1923
Neoaleurodes clandestinus Bondar, 1923
Neoaleurotrachelus Takahashi & Mamet, 1952
Neoaleurotrachelus aphloiae Takahashi & Mamet, 1952
Neoaleurotrachelus bertilloni Cohic, 1966
Neoaleurotrachelus graberi Cohic, 1968
Neoaleurotrachelus sudaniensis Gameel, 1968
Neomaskellia Quaintance & Baker, 1913
Neomaskellia andropogonis Corbett, 1926
Neomaskellia bergii Signoret, 1868
Neopealius Takahashi, 1954
Neopealius rubi Takahashi, 1954
Nigrasialeyrodes Martin & Carver, 1999
Nigrasialeyrodes convexus Martin & Carver in Martin, 1999
Orchamoplatus Russell, 1958
Orchamoplatus caledonicus Dumbleton, 1956
Orchamoplatus calophylli Russell, 1958
Orchamoplatus citri Takahashi, 1940
Orchamoplatus dentatus Dumbleton, 1956
Orchamoplatus dumbletoni Cohic, 1959
Orchamoplatus incognitus Dumbleton, 1956
Orchamoplatus louiserussellae Martin, 1999
Orchamoplatus mammaeferus Quaintance & Baker, 1917
Orchamoplatus montanus Dumbleton, 1956
Orchamoplatus niuginii Martin, 1985
Orchamoplatus noumeae Russell, 1958
Orchamoplatus perdentatus Dumbleton, 1961
Orchamoplatus plumensis Dumbleton, 1956
Orchamoplatus porosus Dumbleton, 1956
Orientaleyrodes David, 1993
Orientaleyrodes indicus Regu & David, 1993
Orientaleyrodes zeylanicus Corbett, 1926
Orstomaleyrodes Cohic, 1966
Orstomaleyrodes fimbriae Mound, 1965
Papillipes Bink-Moenen, 1983
Papillipes spinifer Bink-Moenen, 1983
Parabemisia Takahashi, 1952
Parabemisia aceris Takahashi, 1931
Parabemisia indica Meganathan & David, 1994
Parabemisia jawani Martin, 1985
Parabemisia lushanensis Ko & Luo, 1999
Parabemisia maculata Takahashi, 1952
Parabemisia myricae Kuwana, 1927
Parabemisia myrmecophila Martin, 1985
Paraleurolobus Sampson & Drews, 1941
Paraleurolobus chamaedoreae Russell, 1994
Paraleurolobus imbricatus Sampson & Drews, 1941
Paulianaleyrodes Cohic, 1966
Paulianaleyrodes pauliani Cohic, 1966
Paulianaleyrodes splendens Cohic, 1966
Paulianaleyrodes tetracerae Cohic, 1966
Pealius Quaintance & Baker, 1914
Pealius akebiae Kuwana, 1911
Pealius amamianus Takahashi, 1963
Pealius artocarpi Corbett, 1935
Pealius azaleae Baker & Moles, 1920
Pealius bangkokensis Takahashi, 1942
Pealius bengalensis Peal, 1903
Pealius cambodiensis Takahashi, 1942
Pealius chinensis Takahashi, 1941
Pealius cinnamomi David & Sundararaj, 1991
Pealius cryptus Martin, 1999
Pealius damnacanthi Takahashi, 1935
Pealius elatostemae Takahashi, 1932
Pealius elongatus David, Sudararaj & Regu, 1991
Pealius euryae Takahashi, 1955
Pealius ezeigwi Mound, 1965
Pealius fici Mound, 1965
Pealius indicus David, 1972
Pealius kalawi Singh, 1933
Pealius kankoensis Takahashi, 1933
Pealius kelloggi Bemis, 1904
Pealius kongosana Takahashi, 1955
Pealius liquidambari Takahashi, 1932
Pealius longispinus Takahashi, 1932
Pealius machili Takahashi, 1935
Pealius maculatus Takahashi, 1942
Pealius madeirensis Martin, Aguiar & Pita, 1996
Pealius maskelli Bemis, 1904
Pealius misrae Singh, 1931
Pealius mitakensis Takahashi, 1955
Pealius mori Takahashi, 1932
Pealius nagerkoilensis Jesudasan & David, 1991
Pealius nilgiriensis David, 1972
Pealius polygoni Takahashi, 1934
Pealius psychotriae Takahashi, 1935
Pealius quercus Signoret, 1868
Pealius rhododendri Takahashi, 1935
Pealius rubi Takahashi, 1936
Pealius sairandhryensis Meganathan & David, 1994
Pealius schimae Takahashi, 1950
Pealius setosus Danzig, 1964
Pealius spinosus Jesudasan & David, 1991
Pealius splendens David, Sudararaj & Regu, 1991
Pealius sutepensis Takahashi, 1942
Pealius tuberculatus Takahashi, 1942
Pealius walayarensis Jesudasan & David, 1991
Pectinaleyrodes Bink-Moenen, 1983
Pectinaleyrodes culcasiae Cohic, 1969
Pectinaleyrodes silvaticus Cohic, 1969
Pectinaleyrodes triclisiae Cohic, 1966
Pentaleyrodes Takahashi, 1937
Pentaleyrodes cinnamomi Takahashi, 1932
Pentaleyrodes hongkongensis Takahashi, 1941
Pentaleyrodes linderae Chou & Yan, 1988
Pentaleyrodes yasumatsui Takahashi, 1939
Peracchius Lima & Racca-Filho, 2005
Peracchius durantae Lima & Racca-Filho, 2005
Plataleyrodes Takahashi & Mamet, 1952
Plataleyrodes anthocleistae Takahashi & Mamet, 1952
Pogonaleyrodes Takahashi, 1955
Pogonaleyrodes fastuosa Takahashi, 1955
Pogonaleyrodes zimmermanni Newstead, 1911
Pseudaleurolobus Hempel, 1922
Pseudaleurolobus jaboticabae Hempel, 1922
Pseudaleuroplatus Martin, 1999
Pseudaleuroplatus kiensis Martin, 1999
Pseudaleuroplatus litseae Dumbleton, 1956
Pseudaleyrodes Hempel, 1922
Pseudaleyrodes depressus Hempel, 1922
Pseudozaphanera Manzari, 2006
Pseudozaphanera niger Maskell, 1896
Pseudozaphanera papyrocarpae Martin in Bailey, Martin, Noyes & Austin, 2001
Pseudozaphanera rhachisreticulata Martin, 1999
Pseudozaphanera splendida Martin, 1999
Pseudozaphanera wariensis Martin, 1999
Ramsesseus Zahradnik, 1970
Ramsesseus follioti Zahradnik, 1970
Rhachisphora Quaintance & Baker, 1917
Rhachisphora alishanensis Ko in Ko, Hsu & Wu, 1992
Rhachisphora ardisiae Takahashi, 1935
Rhachisphora capitatis Corbett, 1926
Rhachisphora elongatus Regu & David, 1990
Rhachisphora fijiensis Kotinsky, 1907
Rhachisphora franksae Martin, 1999
Rhachisphora indica Sundararaj & David, 1991
Rhachisphora ixorae Sundararaj & David, 1991
Rhachisphora kallarensis Jesudasan & David, 1991
Rhachisphora koshunensis Takahashi, 1933
Rhachisphora machili Takahashi, 1932
Rhachisphora madhucae Jesudasan & David, 1991
Rhachisphora maesae Takahashi, 1932
Rhachisphora malayensis Takahashi, 1952
Rhachisphora oblongata Ko, Wu & Chou, 1998
Rhachisphora queenslandica Martin, 1999
Rhachisphora reticulata Takahashi, 1933
Rhachisphora rutherfordi Quaintance & Baker, 1917
Rhachisphora sanhsianensis Ko in Ko, Hsu & Wu, 1992
Rhachisphora selangorensis Corbett, 1933
Rhachisphora setulosa Corbett, 1926
Rhachisphora styraci Takahashi, 1934
Rhachisphora taiwana Ko in Ko, Hsu & Wu, 1992
Rhachisphora trilobitoides Quaintance & Baker, 1917
Rosanovia Danzig, 1969
Rosanovia hulthemiae Danzig, 1969
Rugaleyrodes Bink-Moenen, 1983
Rugaleyrodes angolensis Cohic, 1966
Rugaleyrodes bidentata Bink-Moenen, 1983
Rugaleyrodes tetracerae Cohic, 1966
Rugaleyrodes villiersi Cohic, 1968
Rugaleyrodes vuattouxi Cohic, 1969
Rusostigma Quaintance & Baker, 1917
Rusostigma eugeniae Maskell, 1896
Rusostigma radiirugosa Quaintance & Baker, 1917
Rusostigma tokyonis Kuwana, 1911
Rusostigma tristylii Takahashi, 1935
Russellaleyrodes David, 1973
Russellaleyrodes cumiugum Singh, 1932
Septaleurodicus Sampson, 1943
Septaleurodicus mexicanus Sampson, 1943
Setaleyrodes Takahashi, 1931
Setaleyrodes litseae David & Sundararaj, 1991
Setaleyrodes mirabilis Takahashi, 1931
Setaleyrodes quercicola Takahashi, 1934
Setaleyrodes takahashia Singh, 1933
Setaleyrodes thretaonai David, 1981
Setaleyrodes vigintiseta Martin, 1999
Simplaleurodes Goux, 1945
Simplaleurodes hemisphaerica Goux, 1945
Singhiella Sampson, 1943
Singhiella bassiae David & Subramaniam, 1976
Singhiella bicolor Singh, 1931
Singhiella brideliae Jesudasan & David, 1991
Singhiella cambodiensis Takahashi, 1942
Singhiella cardamomi David & Subramaniam, 1976
Singhiella chinensis Takahashi, 1941
Singhiella chitinosa Takahashi, 1937
Singhiella citrifolii Morgan, 1893
Singhiella crenulata Qureshi & Qayyam, 1969
Singhiella delamarei Cohic, 1968
Singhiella dioscoreae Takahashi, 1934
Singhiella dipterocarpi Takahashi, 1942
Singhiella elaeagni Takahashi, 1935
Singhiella elbaensis Priesner & Hosny, 1934
Singhiella ficifolii Takahashi, 1942
Singhiella kuraruensis Takahashi, 1933
Singhiella longisetae Chou & Yan, 1988
Singhiella malabaricus Jesudasan & David, 1991
Singhiella mekonensis Takahashi, 1942
Singhiella melanolepis Chen & Ko, 2007
Singhiella pallida Singh, 1931
Singhiella piperis Takahashi, 1934
Singhiella premnae Martin, 1999
Singhiella serdangensis Corbett, 1935
Singhiella simplex Singh, 1931
Singhiella subrotunda Takahashi, 1935
Singhiella sutepensis Takahashi, 1942
Singhiella tetrastigmae Takahashi, 1934
Singhiella vanieriae Takahashi, 1935
Singhius Takahashi, 1932
Singhius ehretiae Jesudasan & David, 1991
Singhius hibisci Kotinsky, 1907
Singhius morindae Sundararaj & David, 1992
Singhius russellae David & Subramaniam, 1976
Siphoninus Silvestri, 1915
Siphoninus gruveli Cohic, 1968
Siphoninus immaculatus Heeger, 1856
Siphoninus phillyreae Haliday, 1835
Sphericaleyrodes Selvakumaran & David, 1996
Sphericaleyrodes bambusae Selvakumaran & David, 1996
Sphericaleyrodes regui Dubey & Sundararaj, 2006
Tegmaleurodes Martin, 2005
Tegmaleurodes crustatus Bondar, 1928
Tegmaleurodes integellus Bondar, 1923
Tegmaleurodes lentus Martin, 2005
Tetraleurodes Cockerell, 1902
Tetraleurodes acaciae Quaintance, 1900
Tetraleurodes adabicola Takahashi, 1955
Tetraleurodes andropogoni Dozier, 1934
Tetraleurodes bambusae Jesudasan & David, 1991
Tetraleurodes banksiae Martin, 1999
Tetraleurodes bararakae Takahashi, 1955
Tetraleurodes bicolor Bink-Moenen in Bink-Moenen & Gerling, 1992
Tetraleurodes bidentatus Sampson & Drews, 1941
Tetraleurodes bireflexa Nakahara, 1995
Tetraleurodes burliarensis Jesudasan & David, 1991
Tetraleurodes cacaorum Bondar, 1923
Tetraleurodes caulicola Nakahara, 1995
Tetraleurodes chivela Nakahara, 1995
Tetraleurodes confusa Nakahara, 1995
Tetraleurodes contigua Sampson & Drews, 1941
Tetraleurodes corni Haldeman, 1850
Tetraleurodes cruzi Cassino, 1991
Tetraleurodes dendrocalami Dubey & Sundararaj, 2005
Tetraleurodes dorseyi Kirkaldy, 1907
Tetraleurodes dorsirugosa Nakahara, 1995
Tetraleurodes elaeocarpi Takahashi, 1950
Tetraleurodes errans Bemis, 1904
Tetraleurodes fici Quaintance & Baker, 1937
Tetraleurodes ghesquierei Dozier, 1934
Tetraleurodes graminis Takahashi, 1934
Tetraleurodes granulata Bink-Moenen, 1983
Tetraleurodes hederae Goux, 1939
Tetraleurodes hirsuta Takahashi, 1955
Tetraleurodes kunnathoorensis Regu & David, 1993
Tetraleurodes leguminicola Bink-Moenen, 1983
Tetraleurodes madagascariensis Takahashi, 1951
Tetraleurodes malayensis Mound & Halsey, 1978
Tetraleurodes mameti Takahashi, 1938
Tetraleurodes marshalli Bondar, 1928
Tetraleurodes melanops Cockerell, 1903
Tetraleurodes mexicana Nakahara, 1995
Tetraleurodes mirabilis Takahashi, 1961
Tetraleurodes monnioti Cohic, 1968
Tetraleurodes mori Quaintance, 1899
Tetraleurodes moundi Cohic, 1968
Tetraleurodes neemani Bink-Moenen in Bink-Moenen & Gerling, 1992
Tetraleurodes oplismeni Takahashi, 1934
Tetraleurodes pauliani Takahashi, 1955
Tetraleurodes perileuca Cockerell, 1902
Tetraleurodes perseae Nakahara, 1995
Tetraleurodes pluto Dumbleton, 1956
Tetraleurodes pringlei Quaintance & Baker, 1937
Tetraleurodes pseudacaciae Nakahara, 1995
Tetraleurodes psidii David, 1993
Tetraleurodes pusana Takahashi, 1950
Tetraleurodes quadratus Sampson & Drews, 1941
Tetraleurodes quercicola Nakahara, 1995
Tetraleurodes rugosus Corbett, 1926
Tetraleurodes russellae Cohic, 1968
Tetraleurodes selachidentata Bink-Moenen, 1983
Tetraleurodes semibarbata Takahashi, 1955
Tetraleurodes simplicior Bink-Moenen, 1983
Tetraleurodes splendens Bemis, 1904
Tetraleurodes stellata Maskell, 1896
Tetraleurodes stirlingiae Martin, 1999
Tetraleurodes submarginata Dumbleton, 1961
Tetraleurodes subrotunda Takahashi, 1937
Tetraleurodes sulcistriatus Martin, 1999
Tetraleurodes supraxialis Martin, 1999
Tetraleurodes thenmozhiae Jesudasan & David, 1991
Tetraleurodes truncatus Sampson & Drews, 1941
Tetraleurodes tuberculata Bink-Moenen, 1983
Tetraleurodes tuberculosa Nakahara, 1995
Tetraleurodes ursorum Cockerell, 1910
Tetralicia Harrison, 1917
Tetralicia debarroi Martin & Carver in Martin, 1999
Tetralicia erianthi Danzig, 1969
Tetralicia ericae Harrison, 1917
Tetralicia graminicola Bink-Moenen, 1983
Tetralicia iberiaca Bink-Moenen, 1989
Tetralicia tuberculata Bink-Moenen, 1983
Trialeurodes Cockerell, 1902
Trialeurodes abdita Martin, 2005
Trialeurodes abutiloneus Haldeman, 1850
Trialeurodes amealcensis Carapia-Ruiz in Carapia-Ruiz, Gonzalez-Hernandez, Romero-Napoles, Ortega-Arenas & Koch, 2003
Trialeurodes asplenii Maskell, 1890
Trialeurodes bambusae Takahashi, 1943
Trialeurodes bellissima Sampson & Drews, 1940
Trialeurodes bemisae Russell, 1948
Trialeurodes bruneiensis Martin in Martin & Camus, 2001
Trialeurodes celti Takahashi, 1943
Trialeurodes chinensis Takahashi, 1955
Trialeurodes coccolobae Russell, 1948
Trialeurodes colcordae Russell, 1948
Trialeurodes corollis Penny, 1922
Trialeurodes cryptus Martin, 2005
Trialeurodes darwiniensis Martin, 1999
Trialeurodes dicksoniae Martin, 1999
Trialeurodes diminutis Penny, 1922
Trialeurodes drewsi Sampson, 1945
Trialeurodes elaphoglossi Takahashi, 1960
Trialeurodes ericae Bink-Moenen, 1976
Trialeurodes eriodictyonis Russell, 1948
Trialeurodes euphorbiae Russell, 1948
Trialeurodes fernaldi Morrill, 1903
Trialeurodes floridensis Quaintance, 1900
Trialeurodes glacialis Bemis, 1904
Trialeurodes heucherae Russell, 1948
Trialeurodes hutchingsi Bemis, 1904
Trialeurodes intermedia Russell, 1948
Trialeurodes ipomoeae Carapia-Ruiz in Carapia-Ruiz, Gonzalez-Hernandez, Romero-Napoles, Ortega-Arenas & Koch, 2003
Trialeurodes lauri Signoret, 1882
Trialeurodes longispina Takahashi, 1943
Trialeurodes madroni Bemis, 1904
Trialeurodes magnoliae Russell, 1948
Trialeurodes mameti Takahashi, 1951
Trialeurodes manihoti Bondar, 1923
Trialeurodes meggitti Singh, 1933
Trialeurodes merlini Bemis, 1904
Trialeurodes mirissimus Sampson & Drews, 1941
Trialeurodes multipori Russell, 1948
Trialeurodes notata Russell, 1948
Trialeurodes oblongifoliae Russell, 1948
Trialeurodes packardi Morrill, 1903
Trialeurodes palaquifolia Corbett, 1935
Trialeurodes paucipapilla Martin, 2005
Trialeurodes perakensis Corbett, 1935
Trialeurodes pergandei Quaintance, 1900
Trialeurodes phlogis Russell, 1993
Trialeurodes rex Martin in Martin & Camus, 2001
Trialeurodes ricini Misra, 1924
Trialeurodes ruborum Cockerell, 1897
Trialeurodes sardiniae Rapisarda, 1986
Trialeurodes shawundus Baker & Moles, 1921
Trialeurodes similis Russell, 1948
Trialeurodes tabaci Bondar, 1928
Trialeurodes tentaculatus Bemis, 1904
Trialeurodes tephrosiae Russell, 1948
Trialeurodes thaiensis Takahashi, 1943
Trialeurodes unadutus Baker & Moles, 1921
Trialeurodes vaporariorum Westwood, 1856
Trialeurodes varia Quaintance & Baker, 1937
Trialeurodes variabilis Quaintance, 1900
Trialeurodes vitrinellus Cockerell, 1903
Trialeurodes vittatus Quaintance, 1900
Trialeurolonga Martin, 2005
Trialeurolonga trifida Martin, 2005
Trichoaleyrodes Takahashi & Mamet, 1952
Trichoaleyrodes carinata Takahashi & Mamet, 1952
Tuberaleyrodes Takahashi, 1932
Tuberaleyrodes bobuae Takahashi, 1934
Tuberaleyrodes machili Takahashi, 1932
Tuberaleyrodes neolitseae Young, 1944
Tuberaleyrodes rambutana Takahashi, 1955
Tuberaleyrodes spiniferosa Corbett, 1933
Vasantharajiella P. M. M. David, 2000
Vasantharajiella kalakadensis P. M. M. David, 2000
Vasdavidius Russell, 2000
Vasdavidius cobarensis Martin, 1999
Vasdavidius concursus Ko in Ko, Wu & Chou, 1998
Vasdavidius indicus David & Subramaniam, 1976
Vasdavidius miscanthus Ko in Ko, Wu & Chou, 1998
Vasdavidius setiferus Quaintance & Baker, 1917
Venezaleurodes Russell, 1967
Venezaleurodes pisoniae Russell, 1967
Viennotaleyrodes Cohic, 1968
Viennotaleyrodes bergerardi Cohic, 1966
Viennotaleyrodes bicolorata Martin, 1999
Viennotaleyrodes bosciae Bink-Moenen, 1983
Viennotaleyrodes curvisetosus Martin, 1999
Viennotaleyrodes dichrostachi Bink-Moenen, 1983
Viennotaleyrodes fallax Bink-Moenen, 1983
Viennotaleyrodes incomptus Martin, 1999
Viennotaleyrodes lacunae Martin, 1999
Viennotaleyrodes megapapillae Singh, 1932
Viennotaleyrodes nilagiriensis David, Krishnan & Thenmozhi, 1994
Viennotaleyrodes platysepali Cohic, 1966
Xenaleyrodes Takahashi, 1936
Xenaleyrodes artocarpi Takahashi, 1936
Xenaleyrodes broughae Martin, 1985
Xenaleyrodes eucalypti Dumbleton, 1956
Xenaleyrodes fauceregius Martin, 1999
Xenaleyrodes irianicus Martin, 1985
Xenaleyrodes timonii Martin, 1985
Xenobemisia Takahashi, 1951
Xenobemisia coleae Takahashi, 1951
Yleyrodes Bink-Moenen, 1983
Yleyrodes isoberlinae Bink-Moenen, 1983
Zaphanera Corbett, 1926
Zaphanera capparis Bink-Moenen, 1983
Zaphanera cyanotis Corbett, 1926
Zaphanera indicus Jesudasan & David, 1991
Zaphanera publicus Singh, 1938

Aleurodicinae Quaintance & Baker, 1913

Aleurodicus Douglas, 1892
Aleurodicus antidesmae Corbett, 1926
Aleurodicus antillensis Dozier, 1936
Aleurodicus araujoi Sampson & Drews, 1941
Aleurodicus capiangae Bondar, 1923
Aleurodicus cinnamomi Takahashi, 1951
Aleurodicus coccolobae Quaintance & Baker, 1913
Aleurodicus cocois Curtis, 1846
Aleurodicus destructor Mackie, 1912
Aleurodicus dispersus Russell, 1965
Aleurodicus dugesii Cockerell, 1896
Aleurodicus essigi Sampson & Drews, 1941
Aleurodicus flavus Hempel, 1922
Aleurodicus fucatus Bondar, 1923
Aleurodicus guppyi Quaintance & Baker, 1913
Aleurodicus holmesii Maskell, 1896
Aleurodicus indicus Regu & David, 1992
Aleurodicus inversus Martin, 2004
Aleurodicus jamaicensis Cockerell, 1902
Aleurodicus juleikae Bondar, 1923
Aleurodicus machili Takahashi, 1931
Aleurodicus magnificus Costa Lima, 1928
Aleurodicus maritimus Hempel, 1922
Aleurodicus marmoratus Hempel, 1922
Aleurodicus neglectus Quaintance & Baker, 1913
Aleurodicus niveus Martin, 2004
Aleurodicus ornatus Cockerell, 1893
Aleurodicus pauciporus Martin, 2004
Aleurodicus pulvinatus Maskell, 1896
Aleurodicus rugioperculatus Martin, 2004
Aleurodicus talamancensis Martin, 2005
Aleurodicus trinidadensis Quaintance & Baker, 1913
Aleurodicus vinculus Martin, 2004
Aleurodicus wallaceus Martin, 1988
Aleuronudus Hempel, 1922
Aleuronudus acapulcensis Sampson & Drews, 1941
Aleuronudus bondari Costa Lima, 1928
Aleuronudus induratus Hempel, 1922
Aleuronudus jaciae Bondar, 1923
Aleuronudus jequiensis Bondar, 1928
Aleuronudus manni Baker, 1923
Aleuronudus melzeri Bondar, 1928
Austroaleurodicus Tapia, 1970
Austroaleurodicus lomatiae Tapia, 1970
Austroaleurodicus pigeanus Baker & Moles, 1921
Azuraleurodicus Martin, 1999
Azuraleurodicus pentarthrus Martin in Martin & Polaszek, 1999
Bakerius Bondar, 1923
Bakerius amazonicus Penny & Arias, 1980
Bakerius attenuatus Bondar, 1923
Bakerius calmoni Bondar, 1928
Bakerius conspurcatus Enderlein, 1909
Bakerius glandulosus Hempel, 1938
Bakerius maculatus Penny & Arias, 1980
Bakerius phrygilanthi Bondar, 1923
Bakerius sanguineus Bondar, 1928
Bakerius sublatus Bondar, 1928
Costalimada Martin, 2011
Costalimada brasiliensis Martin, 2011
Ceraleurodicus Hempel, 1922
Ceraleurodicus assymmetrus Bondar, 1922
Ceraleurodicus duckei Penny & Arias, 1980
Ceraleurodicus hempeli Costa Lima, 1928
Ceraleurodicus keris Martin, 2004
Ceraleurodicus neivai Bondar, 1928
Ceraleurodicus splendidus Hempel, 1922
Ceraleurodicus varus Bondar, 1928
Dialeurodicus Cockerell, 1902
Dialeurodicus bondariae Martin, 2004
Dialeurodicus caballeroi Martin, 2004
Dialeurodicus cockerellii Quaintance, 1900
Dialeurodicus coelhi Bondar, 1928
Dialeurodicus cornutus Bondar, 1923
Dialeurodicus frontalis Bondar, 1923
Dialeurodicus maculatus Bondar, 1928
Dialeurodicus niger Bondar, 1923
Dialeurodicus radifera Sampson & Drews, 1941
Dialeurodicus silvestrii Leonardi, 1910
Dialeurodicus similis Bondar, 1923
Dialeurodicus tessellatus Quaintance & Baker, 1913
Eudialeurodicus Quaintance & Baker, 1915
Eudialeurodicus bodkini Quaintance & Baker, 1915
Lecanoideus Quaintance & Baker, 1913
Lecanoideus floccissimus Martin, Hérnandez-Suarez & Carnero, 1997
Lecanoideus mirabilis Cockerell, 1898
Leonardius Quaintance & Baker, 1913
Leonardius kellyae Martin, 2004
Leonardius lahillei Leonardi, 1910
Metaleurodicus Quaintance & Baker, 1913
Metaleurodicus arcanus Martin, 2004
Metaleurodicus bahiensis Hempel, 1922
Metaleurodicus cardini Back, 1912
Metaleurodicus griseus Dozier, 1936
Metaleurodicus lacerdae Signoret, 1883
Metaleurodicus minimus Quaintance, 1900
Metaleurodicus phalaenoides Blanchard, 1852
Metaleurodicus stelliferus Bondar, 1923
Metaleurodicus tenuis Martin, 2004
Metaleurodicus variporus Martin, 2004
Nealeurodicus Hempel, 1922
Nealeurodicus altissimus Quaintance, 1900
Nealeurodicus bakeri Bondar, 1923
Nealeurodicus fallax Martin, 2004
Nealeurodicus ingae J. M. Baker, 1937
Nealeurodicus moreirai Costa Lima, 1928
Nealeurodicus octifer Bondar, 1923
Nealeurodicus paulistus Hempel, 1922
Nealeurodicus petiolaris Martin, 2004
Nipaleyrodes Takahashi, 1951
Nipaleyrodes elongata Takahashi, 1951
Octaleurodicus Hempel, 1922
Octaleurodicus nitidus Hempel, 1922
Octaleurodicus pulcherrimus Quaintance & Baker, 1913
Paraleyrodes Quaintance, 1909
Paraleyrodes ancora Martin, 2004
Paraleyrodes bondari Peracchi, 1971
Paraleyrodes cervus Martin, 2004
Paraleyrodes citri Bondar, 1931
Paraleyrodes citricolus Costa Lima, 1928
Paraleyrodes crateraformans Bondar, 1922
Paraleyrodes goyabae Goeldi, 1886
Paraleyrodes minei Iaccarino, 1990
Paraleyrodes naranjae Dozier, 1927
Paraleyrodes perplexus Martin, 2004
Paraleyrodes perseae Quaintance, 1900
Paraleyrodes proximus Terán, 1979
Paraleyrodes pseudonaranjae Martin, 2001
Paraleyrodes pulverans Bondar, 1923
Paraleyrodes singularis Bondar, 1923
Paraleyrodes triungulae Martin, 2004
Paraleyrodes urichii Quaintance & Baker, 1913
Pseudosynaleurodicus Gillespie, 2006
Pseudosynaleurodicus mayoi Gillespie, 2006
Pseudosynaleurodicus nigrimarginatus Gillespie, 2006
Stenaleyrodes Takahashi, 1938
Stenaleyrodes papillote Martin & Streito, 2003
Stenaleyrodes vinsoni Takahashi, 1938
Synaleurodicus Solomon, 1935
Synaleurodicus hakeae Solomon, 1935
Synaleurodicus serratus Martin, 1999

Udamoselinae Enderlein, 1909
Udamoselis Enderlein, 1909
Udamoselis estrellamarinae Martin, 2007
Udamoselis pigmentaria Enderlein, 1909

References

External links

Whiteflies